The women's 100 metres hurdles event at the 1987 Pan American Games was held in Indianapolis, United States, on 13 and 15 August.

Medalists

Results

Heats

Wind:Heat 1: +0.2 m/s, Heat 2: -0.6 m/s

Final
Wind: +1.8 m/s

References

Athletics at the 1987 Pan American Games
1987
Pan